{{speciesbox
|image = Monstera adansonii CBM.png
|genus = Monstera
|species = adansonii
|authority = Schott
|synonyms =
Monstera pertusa (L.) de Vriese 
Dracontium pertusum L. 
Calla dracontium G.Mey. 
Calla pertusa (L.) Kunth Philodendron pertusum (L.) K.Koch & C.D.Bouché
|synonyms_ref = 
|}}Monstera adansonii, the Adanson's monstera, Swiss cheese plant, or five holes plant, is a species of flowering plant from family Araceae which is widespread across much of South America and Central America. Besides South American countries it can also be found in the West Indies on islands such as Antigua, Grenada, Saba, St. Kitts, Guadeloupe, Marie Galante, Dominica, Martinique, St. Lucia, St. Vincent, Tobago, and Trinidad. The species is quite common near river valleys at lower elevations.

The common name "Swiss cheese plant" is also used for the closely related species Monstera deliciosa.

DescriptionMonstera adansonii'' is known for its beautiful heart-shaped leaves. The leaves have a somewhat thick, waxy texture, and contain large oval-shaped perforations, which lead to its common name of "swiss cheese plant". It grows to be 3-5’ tall as a houseplant and up to 13’ as a vine. The Monstera adansonii is an easy to care for houseplant, that likes bright indirect sunlight. This plant needs well-draining soil like peat and perlite potting mix to avoid root rot and water only when the top of the soil becomes dry and reduces watering in the winter.
There are some cultivars with variegated leaves, including 'Archipelago'.

References

adansonii
House plants
Flora of South America
Flora of Mexico
Plants described in 1830